Minerva is an unincorporated community in Lane County, Oregon, United States.

When local settlers petitioned the post office department for a new office in the 1890s, the name "Bays Landing" was suggested to honor local resident James E. Bay. The department suggested a one-word name would be more convenient, so the office was named Minerva after Mr. Bay's wife. L. C. Ackerley wrote the petition and the post office was first located in the Ackerley home. The post office closed in about 1940.

At one time Minerva had a store with a gas pump, a United Evangelical Church, a grange hall, and public school, but none of these remain at the site today. The school at Minerva served students in grades 1 through 8, and older students attended boarding school in Florence. When a road was constructed to Florence students of all ages attended school there and the Minerva school was closed.

References

External links
Historic image of a covered bridge near Minerva from Salem Public Library

Unincorporated communities in Lane County, Oregon
Ghost towns in Oregon
Unincorporated communities in Oregon